Boulevard World (BLVD World) is an entertainment zone and recreational complex located adjacent to Boulevard Riyadh City in the Hittin neighborhood of Riyadh, Saudi Arabia. Opened in 2022, it operates primarily during the annual Riyadh Season entertainment festival and features recreated replicas of iconic landmarks from several Transatlantic and Asian countries besides hosting the Lake Lagoon, a 12-hectares large man-made lake that offers visitors an experience of submarine riding.

Overview 
Boulevard World was first introduced in October 2022 when the chairman of General Entertainment Authority Turki bin Abdul Mohsen al-Sheikh posted a three-minute trailer of the entertainment zone on his official Twitter handle. Boulevard World was inaugurated on 21 November 2022 during the 2022 edition of Riyadh Season, making it the season's largest zone. The inauguration coincided with the commencement of the 2022 FIFA World Cup in Qatar. The zone showcases recreated replicas of several landmarks from ten countries in its eleven sub-zones, that include United States, France, Italy, Morocco, Greece, India, China, Japan, Spain and Mexico. In December 2022, Saudi Gazette reported that the Lagoon Lake in Boulevard World made into the Guinness World Records as the largest artificial lake in the world with an area of 12.19 hectares and a height of 33.7 meters. In January 2023, Turki Al-Sheikh announced the extension of Boulevard World by the end of March 2023, a move similar to the extension of Boulevard Riyadh City in 2019 which was made by Crown Prince Mohammed bin Salman due to its soaring popularity. Boulevard World hosted the Saudi Founding Day, a national holiday to commemorate the establishment of the First Saudi State in 1727.

Subzones 
There are ten culturally-oriented subzones in Boulevard World.

Italian subzone

American subzone

French subzone

Moroccan subzone

Greece subzone

Indian subzone

Chinese subzone

Japanese subzone

Spanish subzone

Mexican subzone

References

Buildings and structures in Riyadh
Tourist attractions in Riyadh
Entertainment venues in Saudi Arabia
2022 establishments in Saudi Arabia